The late-Victorian-era Downtown of Los Angeles grew year by year, around 1880 centered at the southern end of the Los Angeles Plaza area, and over the next two decades, extending south and west along Main Street, Spring Street, and Broadway towards Third Street. Most of the 19th-century buildings no longer exist, surviving only in the Plaza area or south of Second Street. The rest were demolished to make way for the Civic Center district with City Hall, numerous courthouses, and other municipal, county, state and federal buildings, and Times Mirror Square. This article covers that area, between the Plaza, 3rd St., Los Angeles St., and Broadway, during the period 1880 through the period of demolition (1920s–1950s).

At the time (1880-1900), the area was referred to as the business center, business section or business district. By 1910, it was referred to as the “North End” of the business district which by then had expanded south to what is today called the Historic Core, along Broadway, Spring and Main roughly from 3rd to 9th streets.

Location

By the mid-1890s, First and Spring was the center of the business district, and the Bradbury Building, opened in 1893 at Third and Broadway and still standing today, was its anchor at the southwest. By 1910, the area north of Fourth Street was considered the "North End" of the business district and there were already concerns about its deterioration, as the center of commerce moved to what is now known as the Historic Core, from Third to Ninth streets.

Map
The map shows the street grid in 1910, and shows in blue three important road alignment changes that came in the 1920s–1950s: 
Spring Street realignment north of First Street to run parallel to Main Street 
Temple Street extension eastward from Main Street
Creation of the US-101 Freeway and its service roads, called Arcadia and Aliso streets, but not exactly in the positions of the old Arcadia and Aliso streets.

Overview of the area

Buildings

Broadway

Spring Street

Main Street

Buildings along Los Angeles Street

Transportation

Horsecars (1874–1897)
Horse-drawn streetcars started with the Spring and Sixth Street Railroad in 1874. The last horsecars were converted to electric in 1897.

Cable cars (1885-1902)

Cable car street railways in Los Angeles first began operating up Bunker Hill in 1885, with a total of three companies operating in the period through 1902, when the lines were electrified and electric streetcars were introduced largely following the cable car routes. There were roughly 25 miles of routes, connecting 1st and Main in what was then the Los Angeles Central Business District as far as the communities known today as Lincoln Heights, Echo Park/Filipinotown, and the Pico-Union district.

Electric streetcar systems (1887–1963)

Electrically-powered streetcar systems were numerous starting with the Los Angeles Electric Railway in 1887, but were over time consolidated into two large networks:
In 1901, Henry Huntington bought various electric streetcar companies operating mostly within the City of Los Angeles (and not in the San Fernando Valley, Harbor area or Westside) and combined them into the Los Angeles Railway with its "yellow cars".
In 1902, Huntington and banker Isaias W. Hellman established the Pacific Electric Railway, which would acquire other railways, providing interurban service to surrounding towns in what is now Greater Los Angeles (Los Angeles, Orange, San Bernardino and Riverside counties) and new suburban developments. The Pacific Electric Building, with station underneath, was opened in 1905 at 6th and Main Street.

Funiculars
Angel's Flight and Court Flight were funicular railways operating from Broadway up Bunker Hill.

Railroad depots

Los Angeles & San Pedro Railroad Depot, SW corner Alameda and Commercial streets
Los Angeles and Independence Railroad Depot, San Pedro and 5th street (southeast of the business district)
Arcade Depot of the Southern Pacific Railroad along Alameda Street between 5th to 6th streets. Opened 1888, closed 1914.
La Grande Station of the Atchison, Topeka and Santa Fe Railway, Santa Fe at 2nd (East of the business district), opened 1893, closed 1939
Central Station of the Southern Pacific Railroad, Central and 5th streets (southeast of the business district), opened 1914. Union Pacific Railroad started operating from the station in 1924. Disused 1939.
Union Station was opened in 1939, replacing the existing Central and La Grande stations.

Landmarks shown on schematic map

See also
 Sonoratown, Los Angeles
 Old Chinatown, Los Angeles

References

External links 
 Photos of Los Angeles during the 1880s and 1890s at Calisphere (University of California photo search across multiple libraries)
 Los Angeles Theatres (blog with detailed information about cinemas in Los Angeles including streetscapes, neighboring buildings, etc.)

1880s in Los Angeles
1890s in Los Angeles
Civic Center, Los Angeles

Districts of Downtown Los Angeles
Downtown Los Angeles
History of Los Angeles